Kürdmahmudlu, Fizuli may refer to:
Aşağı Kürdmahmudlu, Azerbaijan
Yuxarı Kürdmahmudlu, Azerbaijan